FireHouse (also Firehouse) is an American hard rock band that formed in Richmond, Virginia, and then moved to Charlotte, North Carolina, where they were signed to Epic Records in 1989. The band reached stardom during the early 1990s with hit singles like "Reach for the Sky", "Don't Treat Me Bad" and "All She Wrote", as well as their signature power ballads "I Live My Life for You", "Love of a Lifetime" and "When I Look into Your Eyes". At the 1992 American Music Awards, FireHouse won the award for "Favorite New Heavy Metal/Hard Rock Artist".

As the 1990s progressed, the band remained very popular in Asia, mainly in Southeast Asian countries such as Japan, Thailand, India, Malaysia, Philippines, Indonesia and Singapore. They also maintained popularity in South America and Europe. FireHouse continued to release new material throughout the late 1990s and into the early 2000s, most of which successfully charted in Japan. The band has also continued to tour internationally, having participated twice in the annual Rock Never Stops Tour with other bands from the same genre. FireHouse is estimated to have sold over 7 million albums worldwide since their debut.

Originally composed of vocalist/keyboardist C. J. Snare, guitarist Bill Leverty, drummer Michael Foster and bassist Perry Richardson, the band has maintained its original members with the exception of Richardson, who departed in 2000. Richardson was replaced two times before current bassist, Allen McKenzie, was given the position in 2004.

History

Early beginnings 
The history of FireHouse can be traced back to 1984, when Leverty's band White Heat needed a drummer. After over 20 auditions, current FireHouse drummer Michael Foster answered the ad and when Leverty was impressed by his skill, he quickly hired him. When the band wasn't on tour, Leverty and Foster would visit rock clubs, and it was at one of these clubs where they caught sight of a band called Maxx Warrior. Singing for the band was C. J. Snare, and the band's bassist was Perry Richardson. Leverty and Foster were impressed with Snare's vocal ability, and became determined to unite the bands. As soon as Maxx Warrior broke up, Leverty sent Snare some of his songs and asked him to sing on his tape. Foster and Leverty were again impressed, so they brought Snare in to be the band's lead singer for a show in Virginia several weeks later.

The three-member group took their tape to Perry Richardson, the ex-bassist for Maxx Warrior, who said he liked it but had made a six-month commitment to the band that he was a member of at the time. When the commitment was fulfilled, Richardson and his new bandmates moved to Charlotte, North Carolina and began recording demos in Leverty's bedroom. The band would record all day and play hotel shows at night to earn income. Since Leverty and Foster's band name of White Heat was trademarked, the band chose FireHouse instead. In December 1989, Michael Caplan of Epic Records flew to Charlotte, NC to see a FireHouse show, and told the band immediately following the performance that they were ready for a record deal. The band went into the studio with David Prater as producer. Prater, who later produced bands such as Dream Theater and having drummed with Santana, produced the band's first two albums.

Success in the 1990s 
The band's self-titled debut in 1990, FireHouse, was met with much critical acclaim. The band won the American Music Award for Best New Hard Rock/Heavy Metal Band of 1992, Metal Edge Magazines Best New Band of 1991, Young Guitar Magazines Best Newcomer of 1991, and Music Life Magazines reader's pop poll Best Newcomer of the Year 1992. The band's first album sold over two million copies in the United States, and was certified double platinum by the RIAA. The band's third and most successful single, "Love of a Lifetime", reached No. 3 selling over 500,000 copies. Other singles also charted including the harder-rocking "Don't Treat Me Bad" at No. 14. The first single from the album, "Shake & Tumble" enjoyed success on the radio and brought attention to the band, but it failed to chart on the Pop charts, although it did at Metal radio. The album went on to become certified gold in Canada, Singapore, and Japan.

The band followed their impressive debut with Hold Your Fire in 1992. Although not as successful as its predecessor due to the recent explosion of grunge and alternative rock, Hold Your Fire produced three more hit singles and was certified gold in the US. To date, Hold Your Fire has soundscanned over 873,000 copies in the United States alone. Singles from the album included "Sleeping with You", "Reach for the Sky", and the power ballad "When I Look into Your Eyes". The latter single became a top 10 hit in the United States.

For the band's third album, aptly titled 3, they changed producers. Ron Nevison, who had served as producer for Led Zeppelin, Ozzy Osbourne, Europe, Heart, and many other groups, produced this album. While the band's success had waned in the United States by 3's release in 1995, the album brought them more success overseas than ever before. Despite the album not selling well in the United States compared to previous albums, it was certified gold in several Asian countries, giving the band an opportunity to tour in countries like India and Thailand. The lead single from the album, "I Live My Life for You", was the band's third Top 40 ballad in the United States. Snare remarked that despite drastic changes in the industry, FireHouse was the only band of its genre that managed to have a Top 40 hit as late as 1995, without having to make drastic changes to their sound. 3's follow-up, Good Acoustics, was a collection of acoustic arrangements of several of their greatest hits, as well as four new songs. Good Acoustics, produced by the band's guitarist Bill Leverty, went gold in six countries around the world including Malaysia, Thailand, and the Philippines. Tracks "In Your Perfect World", "You Are My Religion", and "Love Don't Care" became hits in many Asian countries. After the album's release, the band launched their second tour of Asia which ended in late 1996. It was followed by another tour of Indonesia, Thailand, and Japan in February 1997, including several sold-out shows. The band returned to Southeast Asia in July and played an unprecedented 25 city sold-out tour of Indonesia.

After this time, the band asked to be released from their contract due to their label's lack of promotion in the United States. They made a significant change when they signed with Pony Canyon from Japan. With the decline in popularity among rock acts of the 1980s in the US, and their steady fame in Asia and elsewhere abroad, they agreed to release Category 5 with their new label. They toured heavily throughout Asia during 1998 and 1999, achieving great success with their album. They continued to tour heavily in the United States as well, performing on the first ever "Rock Never Stops Tour" all over America in 1998. This tour featured fellow 1980s rock bands including Slaughter and Quiet Riot. On April 22, 1999, FireHouse recorded a live show in Osaka, Japan, and released it with the title Bring 'Em Out Live later that year.

2000 and beyond 

Sometime in 2000, the band parted ways with bassist Perry Richardson due to personal conflict and hired Bruce Waibel, who had played in The Gregg Allman Band for 10 years. Leverty met Waibel in Sarasota, Florida, and was impressed with his bass guitar skills. When the band had an opening for a bassist due to Richardson's departure, Leverty contacted Waibel and asked him to join the band. With Waibel, they recorded their next album, O2, and toured on the Metal Edge 2002 tour with Dokken, Ratt, Warrant, and LA Guns. After the twelve-week tour, Waibel parted ways with the band to spend more time with his family. In 2003, Waibel died unexpectedly at age 45. Guitarist Bill Leverty expressed the band's sadness over his death in a statement shortly after the news broke. Initially, Waibel was replaced by Brazilian Dario Seixas, who played bass on the band's 2003 critically acclaimed album Prime Time, but Seixas left the band shortly after, so the band announced that they were in need of a bass player. Allen McKenzie, who was playing bass for Jani Lane's solo project at the time, sent in his audition tape, and the band agreed that he was the right musician for the job.

In December 2004, FireHouse became the first major international rock band to play concert dates in northeast India. The band's first Indian concert date was in Shillong, followed by two more dates in Dimapur, and Aizawl. The band's first Indian date, in Shillong When the Maharaja of Tripura Kirit Pradyot Deb Burman invited them, took place in front of a sold out stadium crowd of over 40,000, setting a record for that city. The band toured in 2005, 2006, and launched another tour in 2007 visiting states in the Midwest United States such as North Dakota and playing at several festivals including Rocklahoma. In a March 2007 interview, when asked about the band's next album, guitarist Bill Leverty said "we plan on going into the studio this coming winter. Hopefully, we'll be able to get all the songs together and record them for a spring/summer release." Regarding the future of the band, C. J. Snare commented that "this has been an incredible, incredible career. To do something that you love, to be an artist, to be an entertainer and to actually go out there and have fans all over the world and be able to make a living at it... as long as that's perpetuated, I don't see any reason to ever stop."

In 2011 the band released their eighth studio album titled Full Circle, which featured re-recorded versions of some of their older tracks.

Band members

Current members 
C. J. Snare – lead vocals, keyboards (1989–present)
Bill Leverty – lead and rhythm guitars, backing vocals (1989–present)
Michael Foster – drums, percussion, backing vocals (1989–present)
Allen McKenzie – bass, backing vocals (2004–present)

Former members 
Perry Richardson – bass, backing vocals (1989–2000)
Bruce Waibel – bass, backing vocals (2000–2003; died 2003)
Dario Seixas – bass, backing vocals (2003–2004)

Timeline

Discography

Studio albums 
FireHouse (1990)
Hold Your Fire (1992)
3 (1995)
Good Acoustics (1996)
Category 5 (1998)
O2 (2000)
Prime Time (2003)

See also 
 List of glam metal bands and artists

References

External links 

Firehouse official website

CJ Snare's side project website
Bill Leverty's official website
An interview with Bill Leverty at www.metalrulesradio.com

American glam metal musical groups
American hard rock musical groups
Heavy metal musical groups from North Carolina
Musical groups established in 1989
Musical quartets
Epic Records artists
Pony Canyon artists